The Lac de Montriond (Lake of Montriond) is a lake in the Chablais Alps at Montriond in the Haute-Savoie department of France. It has a surface area of 32 ha (79 acres).

There is a circular path around the lake and several restaurants next to the D228 access road (which connects Montriond to Les Lindarets). In winter the lake surface frequently freezes over and the immediate area surrounding the lake experiences extremes of cold due to the topology of the surrounding area blocking most sunlight during the coldest months of winter.

The Lac de Montriond has a minimum altitude of 1062m and maximum altitude of 1189m.

Gallery

References

External links

 Lac de Montriond on Savoie Mont Blanc

Montriond, Lac